Andrea Gropa  was a 14th-century Albanian nobleman who ruled the region and the city of Ohrid, first as a minor vassal for a very short time (župan) to Serbian King Vukašin Mrnjavčević (r. 1365–1371), then as independent after 1370. He was a rival to Prince Marko and together with Andrea II Muzaka managed to take Prilep and Kostur from him. He hailed from the noble Gropa family.

Life
Andrea was a member of the Albanian Gropa family. His ancestor Pal Gropa was acknowledged by Charles I of Naples in 1273: "nobili viro sevasto Paulo Gropa »casalia Radicis maioris et Radicis minons, пeс non Cobocheste, Zuadigorica, Sirclani et Craye, Zessizan sitam in valle de Ebu". During the Serbian expansion in Macedonia, the Gropa also moved towards the south, becoming neighbours with Arianiti and Spata.

After Emperor Dušan's death (1355), Gropa was a local ruler in the district of Ohrid. Prior to the Battle of Maritsa, Gropa was a vassal to the Mrnjavčević family; The King of Serbia Vukašin Mrnjavčević (r. 1365 – died 1371), held Western Macedonia as a co-ruler to Emperor Stephen Uroš V of Serbia (r. 1355 – died 1371).

After the death of King Vukašin and his brother Jovan Uglješa at the Battle of Maritsa against the Ottomans in 1371, and the subsequent death of the Emperor, there was a crisis in appointing the successor of the throne. Vukašin's son, Marko, did not have the power to unite his lords, and only retained nominal rule over the area from his base at Prilep.

After Maritsa, the Dejanovići became Ottoman vassals. By 1377, Vuk Branković extended his rule over Skopje, and Gropa is mentioned as lord of Ohrid. Bogdan, Gropa and Marko, and the rest of the rulers in Western Macedonia became vassals to Murad I. The vassals had to pay tribute to the Ottoman sultan and supply troops in case of war.

Gropa is mentioned as megas zupanos (župan veliki) in a Greek stone inscription dating to 1378. He set himself up as Grand Župan of Ohrid, in southwest Macedonia. In 1379, he became a ktitor for a church in Ohrid dedicated to St. Clement. Gropa was mentioned as "župan Gropa" in the funeral inscription of his son-in-law Ostoja Rajaković (1380).

According to the Muzaka chronicles, Gropa joined Andrea II Muzaka and the Balšić family against Marko; He gained Kostur and Debar, and became virtually independent from Marko.

Gropa also minted coins, findings dating to c. 1377 – c. 1385, inscribed in Old Serbian with his title as župan and gospodar, with his signature as "Po milosti Božijoj župan Gropa". He was the last Christian ruler of Ohrid before the Ottoman conquest. His signature is found in the scriptorium of the Church of St. Sofia in Ohrid.

The date of his death is unknown, the Muzaka chronicles says there were no descendants and that his lands were assigned to the Muzaka family after his death.

Family
Gropa married Anne (Kyranna), the daughter of Andrea II Muzaka. His brother-in-law was Balša II Balšić. Gropa's son-in-law was Ostoja Rajaković, a lord in Ohrid and relative to Marko.

Legacy
Gropa is, like some the other provincial lords during the breakdown and  fall of the Serbian Empire ( between 1354-1371), enumerated in the Serb epic poetry.

References

Sources

 Marko Šuica, „Nemirno doba srpskog srednjeg veka“, Beograd, 2000. 
 М. Шуица, Немирно доба српског средњег века. Властела српских обласних господара, Београд 2001.
 Велики жупан у Лексикон српског средњег века, приредили С. Ћирковић и Р. Михаљчић, Knowledge, Београд 1999.
 Sergije Dimitrijević, Srpska akademija nauka i umetnosti, 1997, Srednjovekovni srpski novac
American Numismatic Society., 1964, Numismatic literature, Issues 58-65, p. 293

Medieval Ohrid
People from medieval Macedonia
14th-century Albanian people
14th-century Serbian nobility
14th-century rulers in Europe
14th-century births
14th-century deaths
People of the Serbian Empire
Andrea
Medieval Albanian nobility
Boyars of Stefan Dušan